The X Army Corps / X AK was a corps level command of the Prussian and German Armies before and during World War I.

X Corps was one of three formed in the aftermath of the Austro-Prussian War (the others being IX Corps and XI Corps).  The Corps was formed in October 1866 with headquarters in Hannover.  The catchment area included the newly annexed Kingdom of Hanover (thereafter the Province of Hanover), the Grand Duchy of Oldenburg and the Duchy of Brunswick.

During the Franco-Prussian War it was assigned to the 2nd Army.

In peacetime, it was assigned to the III Army Inspectorate. which became the 2nd Army at the start of the First World War.  It was still in existence at the end of the war, in Armee-Abteilung B, Heeresgruppe Herzog Albrecht von Württemberg at the extreme southern end of the Western Front.  The Corps was disbanded with the demobilisation of the German Army after World War I.

Franco-Prussian War 
During the Franco-Prussian War of 1870–71 the army corps fought under the command of General von Voigts-Rhetz in several battles including the Battle of Mars-la-Tour, Battle of Spicheren, Siege of Metz, Battle of Beaune-la-Rolande, Battle of Orléans and Battle of Le Mans.

Flags of the Line Infantry regiments 
Due to the large number of Line Infantry regiments then in existence, on 18 December 1890, Kaiser Wilhelm II ordered that the flag colours were to be the same as that of the uniform epaulettes.  This was to ensure that each corps attained uniformity.  IX and X Corps wore white epaulettes.  Notwithstanding this, the flags of the Jäger Battalions would be green.

Peacetime organisation 
The 25 peacetime Corps of the German Army (Guards, I - XXI, I - III Bavarian) had a reasonably standardised organisation.  Each consisted of two divisions with usually two infantry brigades, one field artillery brigade and a cavalry brigade each.  Each brigade normally consisted of two regiments of the appropriate type, so each Corps normally commanded 8 infantry, 4 field artillery and 4 cavalry regiments.  There were exceptions to this rule:
V, VI, VII, IX and XIV Corps each had a 5th infantry brigade (so 10 infantry regiments)
II, XIII, XVIII and XXI Corps had a 9th infantry regiment
I, VI and XVI Corps had a 3rd cavalry brigade (so 6 cavalry regiments)
the Guards Corps had 11 infantry regiments (in 5 brigades) and 8 cavalry regiments (in 4 brigades).
Each Corps also directly controlled a number of other units.  This could include one or more 
Foot Artillery Regiment
Jäger Battalion
Pioneer Battalion
Train Battalion

World War I

Organisation on mobilisation 
On mobilization on 2 August 1914 the Corps was restructured.  19th Cavalry Brigade was withdrawn to form part of the 9th Cavalry Division and the 20th Cavalry Brigade was broken up.  The 17th (Brunswick) Hussars was raised to a strength of 6 squadrons before being split into two half-regiments of 3 squadrons each; the half-regiments were assigned as divisional cavalry to 19th and 20th Divisions.  Likewise, the 16th (2nd Hannover) Dragoons formed two half-regiments which were assigned as divisional cavalry to 17th and 18th Divisions of IX Corps.  Divisions received engineer companies and other support units from the Corps headquarters.  In summary, X Corps mobilised with 25 infantry battalions, 9 machine gun companies (54 machine guns), 6 cavalry squadrons, 24 field artillery batteries (144 guns), 4 heavy artillery batteries (16 guns), 3 pioneer companies and an aviation detachment.

Combat chronicle 
On mobilisation, X Corps was assigned to the 2nd Army forming part of the right wing of the forces for the Schlieffen Plan offensive in August 1914 on the Western Front.

It was still in existence at the end of the war in Armee-Abteilung B, Heeresgruppe Herzog Albrecht von Württemberg at the extreme southern end of the Western Front.

Commanders 
The X Corps had the following commanders during its existence:

See also 

Franco-Prussian War order of battle
German Army order of battle (1914)
Order of battle of the First Battle of the Marne
German Army order of battle, Western Front (1918)
List of Imperial German artillery regiments
List of Imperial German cavalry regiments
List of Imperial German infantry regiments

References

Bibliography 
 
 
 
 
 

Corps of Germany in World War I
History of Hanover (city)
Military units and formations established in 1866
Military units and formations disestablished in 1919